Michaela Dubcová (born 17 January 1999) is a Czech professional footballer who plays as a midfielder for Serie A club AC Milan and the Czech Republic women's national team. She's the twin sister of Kamila Dubcová who is also professional footballer.

Career
Dubcová has been capped for the Czech Republic national team, appearing for the team during the 2019 FIFA Women's World Cup qualifying cycle.

References

External links
 
 
 

1999 births
Living people
Czech women's footballers
Czech expatriate women's footballers
Czech Republic women's international footballers
Women's association football midfielders
1. FC Slovácko (women) players
SK Slavia Praha (women) players
U.S. Sassuolo Calcio (women) players
Serie A (women's football) players
Expatriate women's footballers in Italy
Czech expatriate sportspeople in Italy
Czech Women's First League players
A.C. Milan Women players
People from Valašské Meziříčí
Czech twins